Jason Day del Solar (born July 8, 1986) is a Peruvian actor, born in Lima. He currently stars as the protagonist of Playing with Fire, a Telemundo-Netflix series.

Biography 
Day has starred in the TV series Esta sociedad (Season 1,2) and La Tayson, corazón rebelde, participated in the Fox series recorded in Bogotá and Miami El capo, broadcast by Mundo Fox and RCN, starred in the Latin American remake of the ABC hit series Revenge titled Venganza, Fox Latin America's science fiction series 2091 and, most recently, Telemundo and O'Globo's production Jugar con Fuego, (Playing with Fire). He has starred in the films Mañana te cuento, Mancora, the American independent film 30 Beats, and Atacada, and directed the short film The Revelation. He co-hosted the reality show Secret Story in Peru, and starred in the critically acclaimed, unconventional theatre play Hoy Prometo No Mentir.

Day is known for his human rights and political activism in his home country, Peru, where he has also been a weekly columnist for the newspaper La República.

Filmography

Theatre 
 Laberinto de Monstruos
 Bodas de Sangre
 Los cachorros (2005)
 Espectazul (2006) as Él.
 Interrupciones en el Suministro Eléctrico (2007)
 Hoy Prometo No Mentir (2012) as Gordo.

References

External links
 

Male actors from Lima
Peruvian people of British descent
Peruvian male film actors
Peruvian male stage actors
Peruvian male telenovela actors
Peruvian male television actors
1985 births
Living people
21st-century Peruvian male actors
Reality television participants